Priscilla McLean (née Taylor; born May 27, 1942) is an American composer, performer, video artist, writer, and music reviewer.

Life
Priscilla Taylor was born in Fitchburg, Massachusetts, the daughter of business manager Conrad Taylor and school teacher Grace Taylor. She graduated from Fitchburg State College, Massachusetts (BEd 1963) and the University of Massachusetts, Lowell (BME 1965). At Indiana University, Bloomington (MM 1969), she was greatly influenced by the music of Xenakis, who was teaching there. She has taught at Indiana University, Kokomo (1971-3), St. Mary's College, Notre Dame (1973-6), and the University of Hawaii (1985) and the University of Malaysia (1996). From 1976 to 1980 she produced the American Society of Composers' Radiofest series. In 1974 she and her husband, Barton McLean, began to perform together as The McLean Mix, and in 1983 to present concerts of their own music full-time. She sings with extended vocal techniques and plays the piano, synthesizer, violin, percussion, and Amerindian wooden flutes, as well as newly created instruments.
 
As The McLean Mix, the couple has performed throughout the United States and Europe, Southeast Asia, the United Kingdom, Canada, Australia, and New Zealand. The New Grove Dictionary of Music describes McLean's work as "[ranging] from abstract orchestral and chamber music to dramatic electro-acoustic works. Since 1978 most of her music has focused on the concept of the wilderness and has incorporated sounds from animals and nature along with synthesized music."

Awards
National Endowment for the Arts Composer Grants 
National Endowment for the Arts Media Arts Grant 
Martha Baird Rockefeller Grant
1989 UNESCO International Composers Rostrum, for international broadcast of Voices of the Wild, Albany Symphony, Julius Hedgi, Conductor

Discography
 American Society of University Composers, Advance Recordings FGR-19S (LP), 1976
 American Contemporary—Electronic Music, CRI SD 335 (LP), 1975
 McLean: Electro-Symphonic Landscapes, Folkways Records (later Smithsonian) FTS 33450 (LP), 1979
 Electronic Music from the Outside In, Folkways Records (later Smithsonian) FPX 36050 (LP), 1980
 The McLean Mix—Electro-Surrealistic Landscapes, Opus One Records #96(LP), 1986
 Variations and Mosaics on a Theme of Stravinsky, Louisville Orchestra First Edition Records, LS 762 (LP), 1979
 Rainforest Images, Capstone Records (Parma) CPS-8617 CD, 1993
 Gods, Demons, and the Earth, Capstone Records (Parma) CPS-8622 CD, 1995
 The Electric Performer, Capstone Records (Parma) CPS-8637 CD, 1997
 The McLean Mix & The Golden Age of Electronic Music, CRI (New World) CD 764, 1997
 Vocal Music of Priscilla McLean, Capstone Records (Parma) CPS-8663 CD, 1999
 Barton and Priscilla McLean—Electronic Landscapes, EM Records, Japan, EM 1059 CD, 2006
 McLean Mix Live!, MLC Publications DVD, 2009
 Priscilla McLean—Symphony of Seasons, MLC Publications DVD, 2009
 The McLeans Mix Three, MLC Publications DVD, 2009
 Cries and Echoes, MLC Publications DVD, 2011
 Peter's People—Creating the Dream, MLC Publications DVD, 2012
 Music From the Sounds of Earth, Centaur Records, Inc., CRC 3249 (CD), 2013

Selected works
Rainer Maria Rilke Poems: Three Songs for Soprano Voice and Violin, 1967
Lighting Me as a Match for tenor voice, violin, horn, piano, percussion, 1968
Interplanes for two pianos, 1971
Night Images, electronic, 1973
Dance of Dawn, electronic, 1974
Variations and Mosaics on a Theme of Stravinsky for orchestra, 1975
Messages for chorus, four soloists, chamber ensemble, 1975
Ah-Syn! for autoharp processed through Arp 2600 synthesizer, 1976
Invisible Chariots, electronic, 1977
Fire & Ice for tenor/bass trombone and prepared piano, 1977
Beneath the Horizon I for processed whale songs and tuba quartet, 1978
Beneath the Horizon III for processed whale songs and solo tuba, 1979
Fantasies for Adults and Other Children, eight pieces for soprano, piano and two performers, 1980
The Inner Universe, five pieces for prepared piano and recorded sound 1982
O Beautiful Suburbia! for soprano voice, autoharp or zither, narrator, amplified bicycle wheel and recorded sound, 1984
A Magic Dwells for orchestra and recorded sound, 1986
Elan! A Dance to all Rising Things from the Earth for flute, violin, violoncello, piano, and percussion, 1984
Invocation for hybrid clarinet and soprano recorders, chorus, percussion, amplified bicycle wheel, and recorded sound, 1985
On Wings of Song for soprano voice, amplified bicycle wheel, and recorded sound, 1985
Wilderness for soprano voice, chamber ensemble, and recorded sound, 1988
In Celebration for chorus, piano, percussion, and recorded sound, 1988
Rainforest, collaborative installation with Barton McLean for five performance stations, digital processing, recorded sound, and slides/video, 1989
Voices of the Wild for symphony orchestra and recorded sound, 1989, rev. 2011
The Dance of Shiva, electronic, with fade and dissolve slides/video, 1990
Wilderness for soprano voice, flexatone, and recorded sound, 1990
Flight Beyond, electronic, 1990
Everything Awakening Alert and Joyful! for narrator and orchestra, 1992
Sage Songs About Life! (and Thyme...) for soprano voice and piano, 1992
Rainforest Images, collaboration with Barton McLean, electronic, 1993
Where the Wild Geese Go for Bb clarinet and recorded sound, 1994
Rainforest Images II, collaboration with Barton McLean and Hasnul Jamal Saidon, music and video, 1994
In the Beginning for soprano voice, digital and video processors, recorded sounds, 1995
Jambori Rimba, collaboration with Barton Mclean for soprano voice, processors, soprano recorder, percussion, recorded sound, and video by Hasnul Jamal Saidon, 2000
Jambori Rimba, collaborative installation with Barton McLean and Hasnul Jamal Saidon for five electroacoustic stations, recorded sound, video, slides, and dance, 1997
Desert Spring, collaborative installation with Barton McLean for five electroacoustic stations, recorded sound, American desert slides, 1997
Desert Voices for Zeta midi violin, digital processor, and recorded sound, 1999
The Ultimate Symphonius 2000, collaborative installation with Barton McLean for eight electroacoustic stations, recorded sound, video, slides, and dance, 2000
Angels of Delirium, electronic, 2001
Symphony of Seasons: Jewels of January and The Eye of Spring, electronic music and video, 2001
MILLing in the ENNIUM, electronic music, Barton McLean, and video, Priscilla McLean, 2001
Symphony of Seasons: Autumn Requiem, collaboration with Barton McLean for electroacoustic music ensemble and video by Priscilla McLean, 2002
Symphony of Seasons: July Dance, electronic music and video, 2003
Xaakalawe/Flowing, electronic music and video, 2004
Snowburst Songs: Four Haiku for Winter for soprano voice and piano, 2004
Cyberlament, electronic music, 2005
Caverns of Darkness, Rings of Light for solo tuba, recorded tubas, and video, 2007
Natural Energy, music collaboration with Barton McLean for electroacoustic music ensemble, and video by Priscilla McLean, 2008
Cries and Echoes for solo violoncello, recorded celli, and video, 2009 
Peter's People: Creating the Dream, collaboration with Barton McLean, video featuring interviewed artists and original music, 2012
Pilgrimage, electronic music, 2015
Songs of Radiance: Softly the Morning's Radiance, There Was a Time, and Time is But the Stream, electroacoustic music, 2016
Caribbean Fantasy, electroacoustic music, 2019
Ghost Voices, electroacoustic music, 2020
Ruckus, electroacoustic music, 2021
Quarantined!, electroacoustic music, 2022

Books and films
Hanging Off the Edge— Revelations of a Modern Troubadour, memoir by Priscilla McLean, 279 pp, iUniverse, 2006.
Peter's People— Creating the Dream, Priscilla and Barton McLean, film directors, 2012.

References

External links

New Music Box interview
Capstone Records web link for McLeans

1942 births
20th-century American composers
20th-century American women musicians
20th-century classical composers
20th-century women composers
American classical composers
American electronic musicians
American women classical composers
American women in electronic music
Electroacoustic music composers
Fitchburg State University alumni
Living people
Musicians from Massachusetts
People from Fitchburg, Massachusetts
University of Massachusetts Lowell alumni
21st-century American women